Meramec Township is the name of six townships in the U.S. state of Missouri:

Meramec Township, Crawford County, Missouri
Meramec Township, Dent County, Missouri
Meramec Township, Franklin County, Missouri
Meramec Township, Jefferson County, Missouri
Meramec Township, Phelps County, Missouri
Meramec Township, St. Louis County, Missouri

See also
Meramec (disambiguation)

Missouri township disambiguation pages